Serhiy Danylovskyi (born 20 August 1981 in Tbilisi) is a professional Ukrainian football player, who last played for FC Khimki in the Russian First Division.

Career 
Danylovskyi started his professional football career at Karpaty in the western Ukrainian city of Lviv but, not finding much success there while playing mostly for the second team, he moved to Chornomorets Odessa in 2004. In Odessa Danylovskyi secured a spot in the first team and becoming a fan favourite. After three seasons with Chornomorets, Danylovskyi transferred to the east of the country to a mid-table club Metalurh Donetsk. He earned the manager's trust after the first few matches and in autumn 2007 for the first time was called up to the Ukraine national team for a friendly against Uzbekistan. He made his debut on the 67th minute by substituting Andriy Vorobei.

See also
 2001 FIFA World Youth Championship squads#Ukraine

External links

 

1981 births
Living people
Footballers from Tbilisi
Ukrainian people of Georgian descent
Association football midfielders
Ukrainian footballers
Ukraine international footballers
Ukrainian expatriate footballers
Expatriate footballers in Russia
Ukrainian expatriate sportspeople in Russia
Ukraine youth international footballers
Ukraine under-21 international footballers
Ukrainian Premier League players
FC Chornomorets Odesa players
FC Metalurh Donetsk players
FC Karpaty Lviv players
FC Karpaty-2 Lviv players
FC Karpaty-3 Lviv players
FC Kryvbas Kryvyi Rih players
FC Hoverla Uzhhorod players
FC Khimki players
FC Rukh Lviv players